Epichnopterix plumella is a moth of the family Psychidae. It is found in Europe. The female has no wings and remains in the caterpillar bag.

The wingspan of the male is about 12 mm. Male moths are dark fuscous with strongly pectinate antennae and differ from Psyche species in having fine hair-like scales. The moth flies in one generation from mid-April to mid-June.

The larvae feed on various grass species.

Notes
The flight season refers to Belgium and The Netherlands. This may vary in other parts of the range.

External links
 Microlepidoptera.nl 
 Lepidoptera of Belgium
 Epichnopterix plumella at UK Moths

Psychidae
Moths of Europe